Lake Manjo (also known as Manjo Lake) is a manmade lake in Luzerne County, Pennsylvania, in the United States. The surficial geology near the lake consists of bedrock and Wisconsinan Till. The lake is not accessible to the public. However, a camp known as Camp Orchard Hill is located near the lake.

Geography and geology
The main outflow of Lake Manjo as an unnamed stream that joins Sutton Creek at Lake Louise.

Lake Manjo is a small artificial pond. There is a road in the vicinity of the lake, but it is a posted, private road. There is no public access to the lake.

Lake Manjo is entirely within the United States Geological Survey quadrangle of Center Moreland. It is also located near the community of Center Moreland.

The surficial geology immediately to the north of Lake Manjo mainly features bedrock consisting of sandstone and shale. To the south and west, however, the surficial geology consists of a till known as Wisconsinan Till. A small patch of Wisconsinan Ice-Contact Stratified Drift also occurs a short distance to the west of the lake.

History and recreation
Lake Manjo was entered into the Geographic Names Information System on August 2, 1979. Its identifier in the Geographic Names Information System is 1199105. The lake was also historically known as Manjo Lake. It has existed since at least 1938.

The docks were built by 2010 by Eagle Scout David Novak and weigh more than  apiece. The docks were intended to be multi-use.

A camp known as Camp Orchard Hill is located at Lake Manjo. In 2013, an Eagle Scout made improvements to the lake's waterfront area. These included constructing four benches, building ten mooring stations for boats, and improving the lake's docks.

See also
List of lakes in Pennsylvania

References

Lakes of Luzerne County, Pennsylvania
Reservoirs in Pennsylvania